When I Call Your Name is the third studio album from American country music artist Vince Gill. His breakthrough album, it was released in 1989 by MCA Records, Gill's first for the label. It features the singles "Never Alone," "Oklahoma Swing," "When I Call Your Name" and "Never Knew Lonely."

"Ridin' the Rodeo" was later released by the band Perfect Stranger in 1994 from their debut album You Have the Right to Remain Silent.

Track listing

Production 
 Producer – Tony Brown
 Recorded by John Guess
 Overdubs recorded by Steve Tillisch 
 Sound Engineers – David Boyce, Mark J. Coddington, Julian King, Tim Kish and Marty Williams.
 Digital Editing – Milan Bogdan
 Mixed by Steve Marcantonio
 Mastered by Glenn Meadows 
 Mixed and Mastered at Masterfonics (Nashville, Tennessee).
 Project Coordinator – Jessie Noble 
 Art Direction – Virginia Team
 Design – Jerry Joyner
 Photography – Beverly Parker 
 Management – Fitzgerald Hartley Co.

Personnel 
 Vince Gill – lead vocals, acoustic guitar, electric guitar, mandolin, backing vocals (1, 3, 5, 7, 9)
 Pete Wasner – keyboards
 Barry Beckett – organ (2), acoustic piano (5)
 Randy Scruggs – acoustic guitar, electric guitar
 Fred Tackett – acoustic guitar, electric guitar
 Paul Franklin – steel guitar
 Willie Weeks – bass guitar
 Eddie Bayers – drums, percussion
 Kathie Baillie – backing vocals (2, 9)
 Harry Stinson – backing vocals (3, 7, 10)
 Billy Thomas – backing vocals (3, 7)
 Reba McEntire – lead vocals (4)
 Patty Loveless – backing vocals (5)
 Herb Pedersen – backing vocals (6)
 Anthony Crawford – backing vocals (8)
 Emmylou Harris – backing vocals (10)

Chart performance

Weekly charts

Year-end charts

Certifications

References

1989 albums
Vince Gill albums
MCA Records albums
Albums produced by Tony Brown (record producer)